Hue and Cry is an album by Bobby Previte's Weather Clear, Track Fast released on the Enja label in 1994.

Reception

The Allmusic site awarded the album 4 stars stating "Hue and Cry features an eight-strong, all-star version of Bobby Previte's Weather Clear, Track Fast band and results in one of his finest efforts as a leader".

Track listing
All compositions by Bobby Previte.
 "Hubbub" - 4:06
 "Smack-dab" - 5:59
 "Move Heaven and Earth" - 6:04
 "700 Camels" - 14:11
 "Valerie" - 7:04
 "Hue and Cry" - 13:03
 "For John Laughlan, and All That We Stood For" - 7:15

Personnel
Bobby Previte – drums
Eddie Allen - trumpet
Robin Eubanks - trombone
Don Byron - clarinet, baritone saxophone
Marty Ehrlich - clarinet, soprano saxophone, alto saxophone, flute
Larry Goldings - Hammond organ
Anthony Davis - piano
Anthony Cox - bass

References 

Bobby Previte albums
Enja Records albums
1994 albums